Portlaoise, or Port Laoise, is the county town of County Laois, Ireland. It is located in the South Midlands in the province of Leinster. 

The 2016 census shows that the town's population increased by 9.5% to 22,050, which was well above the national average of 3.8%. It is the most populous and also the most densely populated town in the Midland Region, which has a total population of 292,301 at the 2016 census. This also makes it the fastest growing of the top 20 largest towns and cities in Ireland.

It was an important town in the medieval period, as the site of the Fort of Maryborough, a fort built by English settlers in the 16th century during the Plantation of Queen's County.

Portlaoise is fringed by the Slieve Bloom mountains to the west and north-west and the Great Heath of Maryborough to the east. It is notable for its architecture, engineering and transport connections.

It was once known for the manufacture of iron and steel buildings, tennis balls, rubber seals, tyres, electrical cabling, and Ireland's first aircraft. Today Portlaoise is a commercial centre, with the economy dominated by the service sector, and a hub of shopping, transport, and events for the surrounding catchment.

History

The site of the present town is referred to in the Annals of the Four Masters, written in the 1630s, as Port Laoighisi. The present town originated as a settlement around the old fort, "Fort of Leix" or "Fort Protector", the remains of which can still be seen in the town centre. Its construction began in 1548 under the supervision of the then Lord Deputy Sir Edward Bellingham, in an attempt to secure English control of the county following the exile of native Celtic chieftains the previous year. The fort's location on rising ground, surrounded to the south and east by the natural defensive barricades of the River Triogue and an esker known locally as 'the Ridge', greatly added to its strategic importance.

The town proper was established by an Act of Parliament during the reign of Queen Mary in 1557. Though the early fort and its surrounding settlement had been known by a number of names, such as Governor, Port Laois, Campa and Fort Protector, the new town was named Maryborough (IPA [ˈmarbrə]) and the county was named Queen's County in Mary's honour. In about 1556, Portlaoise acquired its first parish church—Old St Peter's—situated to the west of Fort Protector. Although first built as a Catholic church, due to Queen Mary's re-establishment of Roman Catholicism, the church was used for Protestant services after the accession to the English throne of Mary's half-sister, Elizabeth.

The area had been a focus of the rebellion of Ruairí Óg Ó Mórdha, a local chieftain who had rebelled and had lost his lands, which the Crown wanted to be settled by reliable landowners. For the next fifty or so years, the new English settlers in Maryborough fought a continual, low-scale war with the Gaelic chieftains who fought against the new settlement. The town had been burnt several times by the end of the 16th century.

Maryborough was granted a market in 1567, and then in 1570, a charter of Queen Elizabeth I raised the town to the rank of borough. This allowed the establishment of a Corporation of the Borough, a body which consisted of a burgomaster, two bailiffs, a town clerk, and a sergeant at arms, as well as various other officers, burgesses and freemen. The Maryborough Division was represented by two members in the Irish Parliament until 1800. The Act of Union ended this franchise, and it became part of the electorate of Queen's County until 1922. The town's Corporation itself existed until 1830.

In 1803–04, a new Church of Ireland church was built to replace the Old St Peter's; it was the first building to be erected on the new Market Square. The building is attributed to architect James Gandon. Other notable buildings constructed in Maryborough in the 19th century included the now-destroyed French Renaissance-style Town Hall on Market Square; the Court House on Main Street, built in 1805; the County Gaol built in 1830 to a design by William Deane Butler; and the neo-classical St. Fintan's Hospital, built in 1833 on the Dublin Road.

The city of Maryborough, Victoria in Australia was named in the 1850s after his birthplace by James Daly, a gold commissioner, 

In 1929, a few years after the foundation of the Irish Free State, the town was renamed Portlaoighise (later simplified to Port Laoise) and the county was renamed County Laois.

Local government

The town forms part of the Portlaoise local electoral area and municipal district for elections to Laois County Council. This includes the urban Portlaoise area, Abbeyleix and Ballinakill and surrounding rural areas. As of 2020, the total population of the Portlaoise local electoral area is 31,794 people. Portlaoise's Town Council was abolished in 2014.

Portlaoise is twinned with Coulounieix-Chamiers in the Dordogne département of France.

Demography

Portlaoise is one of Ireland's fastest growing towns, with a 37.9% increase in population from 2006 to 2011. Non-Irish nationals accounted for 21.7% of the population compared with a national average figure of 12.0%. Polish (7%) were the largest group, followed by Lithuanians (2.7%). The former Mayor, Rotimi Adebari, was the first person of African descent to become a mayor in Ireland.

Portlaoise has the highest percentage of people under the age of 18 in Ireland. Due to rapid population growth (due in particular to immigration from Eastern Europe, especially Poland and Slovakia) and its location in the commuter belt, Portlaoise has seen the development of additional services, including a new fire station and a large swimming leisure complex. Portlaoise has three new secondary schools and five new primary schools. In the 2016 Census Portlaoise was again in the top 10 fastest growing regions, with the population of the town and its suburbs exceeding 22,000.

Economy
Portlaoise has long been a major commercial and retail hub for the Midlands. Until the mid 20th century, the main industries of the town were flour milling and the manufacture of worsted fabric. Since their respective declines, among the largest employers are state-owned bodies such as the maximum-security Portlaoise Prison, which houses the majority of the Irish Republican  prisoners sentenced in the Republic, the Midlands Prison, the Department of Agriculture and the Midland Regional Hospital, Portlaoise. State-owned companies Córas Iompair Éireann (railways, with a National Traincare Maintenance Depot in Portlaoise), the ESB (utilities, with a training centre in the town) and also An Post are all major employers. In 2013 MyPay, a new central payroll system for 55,000 local authority employees across Ireland, was set up in Portlaoise.

Due to its location and transport connections, the National Spatial Strategy chose Portlaoise as the location for Ireland's first "Inland Port". This designation encourages the town to focus on the growth of distribution, logistics and warehouse uses. An Post operates the second largest mail centre in Ireland (after Dublin) at their depot in Portlaoise.

Retail
Retail spaces include Laois Shopping Centre which is anchored by Tesco, The Kyle Centre which is anchored by Dunnes Stores, Parkside Shopping Centre which is anchored by Super Valu, the Kylekiproe road retail area which houses Aldi, Lidl and Shaws department stores as well as retail parks in Kea Lew and on the South Circular Road.

Tourism

Tourist sites near the area include the Rock of Dunamase, a hill-top castle which dates from the 12th Century. There is also a 12th-century round tower 12 km away in Timahoe.

Also close by is Fort Protector, a 16th-century fort built to protect British colonists from Irish natives.

Emo Court is a large Georgian estate designed by James Gandon at nearby Emo.

Transport

Portlaoise stands at a major crossroads in the Irish roads network (major roads to Dublin, Limerick, Cork) although construction in the 1990s of the M7 motorway, which bypasses the town, has reduced traffic congestion in the town centre.

Portlaoise railway station is one of the busiest railway stations outside of Dublin, and is served by intercity trains between Dublin and Cork and by Dublin commuter services. Maryborough railway station opened on 26 June 1847. It is the terminus of the Portlaoise Commuter Service, which stops at all stations to Heuston and runs hourly off peak and every 20/30 minutes during peak times. It is the busiest county town railway station in the Midland Region, with up to 32 trains to Dublin (10 non-stop) and 30 trains from Dublin (9 non-stop) per day. Córas Iompair Éireann opened a rail depot south-west of Portlaoise town centre in March 2008, with a maintenance and servicing facility for the 183 new intercity railcars and some facilities for outer suburban railcars serving the Kildare route.

Bus Éireann operates an intercity service between Dublin and Cork/Limerick which calls at Portlaoise. The town is also the terminus for Dublin-Portlaoise coach services operated by Dublin Coach, which is at James Fintan Lawlor Avenue.

The Stradbally Steam Museum in nearby Stradbally is dedicated to steam engines. It is home to a large collection of steam engines including the Mann Steam Cart and Fowler. The museum shows the transport of the past in Portlaoise and Ireland. The Steam Preservation Society have a 1 km train track on the grounds of Stradbally Hall which offers trips for train enthusiasts.

Aviation History
Portlaoise is the birthplace of aviation in Ireland. The first aeroplane made in Ireland was assembled in the town by Frank & Louis Aldritt, William Rogers & John Conroy, and made its first flight as reported in the King's County Chronicle on 4th November 1909. Put in store during troubled years when wars waged on and on,  WW1, the Irish War of Independence, Irish Civil War, WW2 it then disappeared from the town to be discovered over 50 years later in an English museum by Joe Rogers, son of William Rogers, one of the original builders of the aircraft.It was eventually brought back to Portlaoise where it has been restored and hopefully, will soon be on show to the public.

Culture and community

Nightlife

Portlaoise's central location within Ireland and its concentration of restaurants, pubs, bars and nightclubs around Market Square, Main Street and the Church Street area of the town centre and other nearby facilities such as paintball, golf, bowling and other amenities make it a popular destination for hen & stag parties and other weekend breaks. Portlaoise railway station is the closest station to Stradbally Hall where the Electric Picnic Festival is held each year.

Arts and festivals
Every year the town hosts the Old Fort Quarter Festival in June, the Halloween Howls Comedy Festival on the October bank holiday weekend and the Leaves Literary Festival in November.

The Dunamaise Arts Centre which comprises a cinema, performance space and exhibition space is located in the building which formally housed the Maryborough Gaol. The opening of the Arts Centre in 1999 coincided with the revival of the Laois Drama Group.

The "Old Fort Festival", which was moved from 2019 into the grounds of the old Fort itself, is an annual event but was postponed in 2020 as a result of the COVID-19 pandemic. The 3 day heritage festival is based in and around the walls of the Old Fort Protector, the first of its kind built in Ireland between 1547 and 1548 during the tenure of Bellingham, Lord Justice of Ireland, in the reign of "the boy King" Edward VI. 

The Stradbally Steam Rally is an annual event held on the August bank holiday weekend in Stradbally Hall. It attracts visitors from all over Ireland and is the highlight of the year for steam enthusiasts.

The All-Ireland Scarecrow Festival is held in Durrow at the end of July each year. It has featured large scarecrows including King Kong, Pope Francis, Noah's Ark and Electric Picnic. The town is dotted with scarecrows made by local groups, children, businesses and people from neighbouring counties.

Charity
Since 2008, Portlaoise has been the Irish base of Self Help Africa, formerly Self Help Development International, a development agency engaged in implementing rural development programmes in Sub-Sahara. Established at the time of the Ethiopian Famine of 1984, the organisation is the chosen charity of the Irish Farmers Association.

Sport
Portlaoise RFC, a local rugby club, is based outside the town at Togher. Portlaoise GAA is the local Gaelic Athletic Association club and the most successful GAA club in Leinster. Other local sports clubs include Portlaoise Association Football Club and Portlaoise Senior Basketball Club.

Sporting facilities in the area include Portlaoise Leisure Centre (which has a 25m pool, a gym, astro and soccer pitches, and a skate park) and Portlaoise Golf Club (which has an 18-hole course on the Abbeyleix Road).

Portlaoise AFC is located on the Mountmellick road in Rossleighan Park.

Education
Portlaoise College is situated just minutes from the heart of Portlaoise. Portlaoise College provides full-time education for over 300 students in Junior and Leaving Certificate Cycle and has the worst record in Laois of pupils going on to third level, with 46% of students continuing education after obtaining their leaving certificate.

Portlaoise Institute offers further education courses, including QQI Level 5 and 6 Courses. These include courses and professional certification in beauty therapy, hairdressing, healthcare, nursing, business studies, information technology, and sports and leisure management.

Notable people
 Arthur Jacob – Professor of Anatomy (Ophthalmologist)
 Sean O'Rourke – RTÉ journalist and broadcaster
 James Fitzmaurice – aviation pioneer
 Pat Critchley – GAA dual player (Footballer & All Star winner at Hurling) 
 Pat Boran – poet and radio presenter
 Bartholomew Mosse – founder of the Rotunda Hospital, Dublin
 Stephen Hunt – association football player, was born in Portlaoise in 1981
 Pádraig Mac Lógáin – the only two-time President of Sinn Féin owned a pub on Main Street
 Robert Sheehan – actor (Misfits, Love/Hate, The Umbrella Academy).
 Zach Tuohy – Australian Football League premiership player (2022) for the Geelong Football Club
 TJ Doheny - Professional Boxer, former IBF World Super Bantamweight Title holder.
 Brian Rigney - (born 22 September 1963) is an Irish former rugby union player who won 8 caps for his country between 1991 and 1992.
 Damien Bowe - singer and former member of Irish boyband D-Side.
 Anne Keenan-Buckley (1962-) - middle-distance runner who was on the Irish 1988 Summer Olympics team.
 Eoghan Masterson – professional rugby player for Connacht
 Alison Miller – professional rugby player
 Colm Parkinson - retired Gaelic footballer and journalist

See also

 List of towns and villages in Ireland

References

External links

Photographs of contemporary Portlaoise plus photos of, and documents relating to, old Portlaoise

 
1557 establishments in Ireland
County towns in the Republic of Ireland
Dry ports
Populated places established in 1548
Townlands of County Laois
Towns and villages in County Laois